Dictysarcidae is a family of trematodes belonging to the order Plagiorchiida.

Genera:
 Aerobiotrema Yamaguti, 1958
 Albulatrema Yamaguti, 1965
 Cylindrorchis Southwell, 1913
 Dictysarca Linton, 1910
 Elongoparorchis Rao, 1961
 Pelorohelmis

References

Plagiorchiida